St. Marcellinus Secondary School (commonly referred to as Marcies) is a Catholic high school located in Mississauga, Ontario. The founding principal of St. Marcellinus, John McAllister, was succeeded by Thomas Wisnicki, Frank Furgiuele, and (most recently) Annibale Iarossi.

History
The construction of St. Marcellinus was necessary to decrease overpopulation at St. Joseph Secondary School and St. Francis Xavier Secondary School by providing teens living in the newly developed Meadowvale Village area an easily accessible secondary school. John McAllister was hired as the founding principal of the school, along with only 12 original teachers and 3 secretaries. The school opened with 143 grade 9 students in a temporary location in Streetsville during its formation. The school shared this facility with John Cabot Catholic Secondary School and St. Edmund Campion Secondary School. In September 2004, the school moved to its new permanent facility at Mavis Road and Courtneypark Drive West. The state of the art institution is part of a shared facility agreement with the City of Mississauga. The campus includes the second largest library in the City of Mississauga and a track and field complex that boasts a $1,000,000 artificial field and an 8 lane all weather track. St. Marcellinus Secondary School is well known for academic excellence and athletic expertise with a wide variety of clubs and arts activities. The school motto is “Let Every Spirit Soar.” In 2013, the St.Marcellinus Improv Team won first place in the Canadian Improv Games, the first team from Mississauga ever to win the National title.

Feeder Schools
 St. Barbara Catholic Elementary School
 St. Gregory Catholic Elementary School
 St. Julia Catholic Elementary School
 St. Veronica Catholic Elementary School

Courtneypark Library

The Courtneypark Library serves as both a community library with resources and programs geared to the everyday requirements of all ages of users, and a school library for the school. This library is a shared facility between the City of Mississauga and the Dufferin-Peel Catholic District School Board.

Specialist High Skills Major (SHSM)
St. Marcellinus Secondary School offers a Specialist High Skills Major program in Hospitality & Tourism and Arts & Culture. Students can earn credits and receive a certificate in Hospitality when they graduate.

The SHSM is a ministry-approved specialized program that allows students to focus their learning on a specific economic sector while meeting the requirements for the Ontario Secondary School Diploma (OSSD) and assists in their transition from secondary school to apprenticeship training, college, university, or the workplace.

An SHSM enables students to gain sector-specific skills and knowledge in the context of engaging, career-related learning environments and helps them focus on graduation and on pursuing their post secondary goals.

Uniform
Like many Catholic Secondary Schools in Dufferin Peel's Catholic District School Board, St. Marcellinus has a uniform policy. Originally, the uniform consisted of a unisex white polo, a unisex red sweater, a unisex vest, long black pants for males and females, and a plaid skirt for females. As of September 2012, the plaid skirts were banned. The uniform has been continuously updated since the school's inception in 2003 and newer variations of sweaters, pants, and polo shirts have been recently introduced.

Lab Explosion 
In March 2010, a routine chemistry experiment at St. Marcellinus exploded into flames when a Bunsen burner ignited a beaker full of methanol. The incident sent five students to the hospital and left one student critically injured. Lab safety experts determined that the incident could have been prevented with better safety equipment.

Stabbing 
On April 26 2022, an altercation occurred on the soccer field shortly after 12pm. The police were called just before 12:30pm and discovered that 2 students had been stabbed during the altercation, and that the suspect had fled the scene. During this time, St. Marcellinus was placed under lockdown and Mississauga Secondary was placed in a hold and secure until the police confirmed that there was no longer a threat. The two students were transported to a local hospital and treated for non life threatening stab wounds. The suspect, a 15 year old who was not a St. Marcellinus student, was located and taken into custody. He is scheduled to appear in court at a later date.

Promposals
St. Marcellinus has become well known on the internet for being the host of extravagant and creative proposals, with many flash-mob styles promposal videos hosted in the school's cafetorium gaining thousands of views on YouTube since the school's inception. The most well known video to date is a flash mob to One Direction's "What Makes You Beautiful", and currently has over 280,000 views on YouTube.

Notable alumni
 RJ Barrett, NBA Player
 Brandon Bridge, CFL Football Player
 Jonelle Filigno, Soccer Player, Olympics, and National Women's Soccer League
Dominic Panganiban, YouTube animator
Caleb Houstan, NBA Basketball Player
Eric Colonna, Football Player at Queens University

See also
List of high schools in Ontario
Courtneypark Library

References

Educational institutions established in 2003
High schools in Mississauga
Catholic secondary schools in Ontario
2003 establishments in Ontario